Robert Sin (born 14 January 1993) is a Greek singer and songwriter.

Biography 
Robert Sin was born and raised in Arta, Greece. He started playing the piano at age six and later he picked up the guitar. He started writing songs and recording them in his bedroom studio at age 14.

Robert Sin & The Sinners

In 2013, Sin recorded his first EP "Death & Other Misdemeanors" with friends and members of a Greek underground rock band known as "The Sinners". The EP was released in 2014 in digital form. 

Vassilis Bas Athanassiadis played the guitar (:el:No Man's Land, Terrapin), George Papageorgiadis the bass (No Man's Land, Terrapin), Evi Hassapides Watson sang some backing vocals (No Man's Land, :el:Echo Tattoo, She Tames Chaos), Panos Kourtsounis Ganas played the lead guitar in the song "Stella" (Echo Tattoo, Apagorevmeno Dassos), George Tzivas (Terrapin) and Agis Gritzios-Fouskas (Hungry Dukes) played the drums and Stavros Parginos (Opera Chaotique) the Cello on "Stella" and Robert Sin played the guitar, keyboards and sung the songs. Dimitris Misirlis recorded and mixed the record at Matrix Studios Athens. .

Robert Sin & The Huckleberries

In 2014, Sin moved to Athens, where he played some solo shows and joined a band named "She Tames Chaos" as a guitar player. 

In January 2015, he created a new band "The Huckleberries". The band consists of Stelios Habipis on guitar and Dimitris Bouroussas on drums, both known for playing in the underground Greek band Libido Blume, Thodoris "Theo" Karampalis on keys, Evi Hassapides Watson (the lead singer of No Man's Land, Echo Tattoo and She Tames Chaos) on bass and Sin on vocals and guitars. 

The band went into the studio in June 2015 and recorded some songs with the help of recording engineer Kostis Raisis. The album was mixed by Sin. These songs released in April 2016 on CD in collaboration with G.O.D. Records. The album is called "… And The Ghosts In Between".. 

Sin and the Huckleberries released their sophomore album in March 2019. The album is called "Dot On The Map" and was to be the last "Huckleberries" album.

Discography

The Sinners
 2014 Death & Other Misdemeanors (EP)

The Huckleberries
 2016 ... And The Ghosts In Between
 2019 Dot On The Map

References

Living people
1993 births
Greek musicians
People from Arta, Greece